The Japan Racing Association Plate is an Australian Turf Club Group 3 Thoroughbred quality handicap horse race for horses three years old and older, held over a distance of 2000 metres at Randwick Racecourse, Sydney, Australia in April. Prizemoney is A$160,000.

History

Name
 1997–2007 - Japan Racing Association Plate
 2008 - Japan Trophy
 2009 onwards - Japan Racing Association Plate

Grade
 1997–2013 - Listed race
 2014 onwards - Group 3

Winners

 2022 - Polly Grey
 2021 - Paths Of Glory 
 2020 - Life Less Ordinary 
 2019 - Grey Lion 
 2018 - Tally 
 2017 - Top Of My List 
 2016 - Guardini
 2015 - Gypsy Diamond
 2014 - Spillway
 2013 - Kelinni
 2012 - Western Symbol 
 2011 - Hawk Island 
 2010 - Herculian Prince 
 2009 - Prima Nova 
 2008 - Viewed 
 2007 - Safwa 
 2006 - Above Deck 
 2005 - Jeremiad 
 2004 - On A High 
 2003 - Pentastic 
 2002 - Restless 
 2001 - Bowood Forest 
 2000 - Vitrinite 
 1999 - Tie The Knot  
 1998 - Back In The Saddle
 1997 - Sharscay

See also
 List of Australian Group races
 Group races

References

External links 
First three placegetters Japan Racing Association Plate (ATC)

Horse races in Australia
Randwick Racecourse